Nikhil Pingle is an Indian figure skater. He started skating at the age of 7.He started with recreational skating and transitioned into competitive speed skating for a duration of 4 years. His experiences with speed skating made leeway for artistic roller skating. It led him to pursue figure skating where he has competed in a number of tournaments including the 2017 Asian Winter Games in Sapporo, Japan.

Achievements

International Participations – 
 ISU World Development Trophy 2014 – Manila, Philippines
 Asian Open Figure Skating Championship 2014 – Bangkok, Thailand
 ISU World Junior Grand Prix 2014 – Ostrava, Czech Republic
 ISU World Development Trophy 2015 – Manila, Philippines
 Malaysian Open Figure Skating Championship 2015 – Kuala Lampur, Malaysia
 Asian Open Figure Skating Championship 2015 – Taipei, Taiwan
 ISU World Junior Grand Prix 2015 – Nagoya, Japan
 ISU World Development Trophy – Zagreb, Croatia
 2017 Asian Winter Games, Sapporo, Japan

References

External links
 

Living people
Indian male single skaters
Figure skaters at the 2017 Asian Winter Games
Asian Games competitors for India
Year of birth missing (living people)